Malaga is a 1954 British adventure film directed by Richard Sale and starring Maureen O'Hara, Macdonald Carey and Binnie Barnes. O'Hara appears as a former O.S.S. secret agent and Carey a smuggler. The film takes its title from Málaga in Spain where it was primarily shot on location. It was distributed in Britain by British Lion Films and by Columbia Pictures in America under the alternative title Fire Over Africa.

Production
Although an international cast of primarily British and German actors was involved, American producer Mitchell "Mike" Frankovich and director Richard Sale crafted a thriller set in the international city of Tangiers. Location shooting took place around Málaga in Andalucía with studio footage shot at Shepperton Studios, London from early November to mid-December 1953. The film's sets were designed by the art directors Vincent Korda and Wilfred Shingleton.

During pre-production, Errol Flynn and Indian actress Nimmi were considered for lead roles before casting was completed. While Maureen O'Hara played a James Bond-type spy, her personal life was in turmoil after a messy custody battle following a divorce. Her casting in Malaga was instrumental in winning a court case against the tabloid Confidential. Peter Sellers reportedly dubbed at least six actors in the cast without credit, with one account listing as many as 14 roles being dubbed. One of the cast was Irish-born American actor James O'Hara, Maureen O'Hara's brother.

Plot
Joanna Dane (Maureen O'Hara) is sent to Tangiers to get information on, and close down, an international smuggling ring.  Dane is adept at jiu jitsu, firearms, and wisecracks that she uses on anyone who tangles with her.  Her beauty, attractive outfits and skill with playing cards get her a position as a croupier at a smuggler's hangout called Frisco's, run by the hard blonde Frisco (Binnie Barnes). Joanna also is pursued by smuggler Van Logan (MacDonald Carey), who she uses by having him take her to Ali Baba's, a parfumerie run by the suspicious Mustapha (Ferdy Mayne).

During her work at Frisco's, Joanna is pestered by Danny Boy (James Lilburn), Logan's Irish assistant, who ignores her insults and warnings to let her alone.  When the embarrassed Danny Boy threatens Joanna, she grabs him and throws him to the floor. Augie (Harry Lane) – another target of Joanna's surveillance—beats Danny Boy's head with his cane, knocking him unconscious.  Logan fights with Augie, revealing he carries a sword cane by tossing the blade at Logan.

Joanna accompanies Logan, Danny Boy and his crew on their boat the Banshee to smuggle goods into Spain where they are hijacked by a boat led by Augie.  The Banshee manages to escape but without their cargo.  Logan is arrested by the Civil Guard but manages to escape with Augie unsuccessfully attempting to assassinate Joanna.  Joanna tracks down the smuggling ring, shooting Logan and discovers the real head of the smuggling ring whom she has eliminated by the Civil Guard.

Cast

 Maureen O'Hara as Joanna Dane 
 MacDonald Carey as Van Logan
 Binnie Barnes as Frisco
 Guy Middleton as Soames Howard 
 James O'Hara as Danny Boy  
 Leonard Sachs as Paul Dupont
 Harry Lane as Augie
 Bruce Beeby as Potts
 Meinhart Maur as Jakie 
 Hugh McDermott as Richard Farrell 
 Ferdy Mayne as Mustapha
 Eric Corrie as Pebbles
 Derek Sydney as Signor Amato
 Jacques Cey as 	Monsieur Duclois
 Gérard Tichy as 	Cronkhite 
 Mike Brendel as Tiger
 Antonio Casas as 	Aziz
 Dino Galvani as 	Hotel Clerk
 Harold Kasket as 	Police Chief 
 Larry Taylor as	Mustapha's Henchman

See also
 List of British films of 1954

References

Bibliography

 Sellers, Michael and Gary Morecambe. Sellers on Sellers.  London: André Deutsch, 2000. 
 Walker, Alexander. Peter Sellers: The Biography. London: Weidenfeld and Nicolson, 1981. .

External links
 
 

1954 films
1950s crime films
1954 adventure films
Films directed by Richard Sale
1954 drama films
Films scored by Benjamin Frankel
Films set in Tangier
Films set in Andalusia
Films shot in London
Films shot in Spain
British adventure films
British drama films
Films shot at Shepperton Studios
British Lion Films films
1950s English-language films
1950s British films